Hōchiyama Kōkan (born January 18, 1982 as Yukimi Munakata) is a former sumo wrestler from Hirosaki, Aomori Prefecture, Japan. He joined professional sumo in 2000. His highest rank was maegashira 14, achieved in 2006. After illness saw him demoted to the third makushita division in 2008, he returned to the second highest jūryō division in 2010 and the top makuuchi division in September 2011. After winning the sandanme division he had just been demoted to in November 2013, he chose to retire. He is now a coach at Sakaigawa stable.

Career

He was born in the city of Hirosaki (as was Wakanosato). Hōchiyama was a member of Kizukuri High School sumo club (also attended by Mainoumi) and he made his professional debut in March 2000. He joined the Nakadachi stable set up by former komusubi Ryōgoku, which was subsequently renamed Sakaigawa stable.

Hōchiyama took the jonokuchi championship with a perfect 7-0 record in his first tournament as a rikishi and he earned promotion to sandanme in November 2000 with another 7-0 score. However he found his opponents in the third makushita division much more difficult to deal with and his progress slowed. He narrowly missed out on promotion to the second highest jūryō division a number of times, recording 3-4 marks at makushita 1 in July 2004 and November 2005. After 24 tournaments in the third division he finally achieved promotion in January 2006 when a 4-3 score at makushita 4 was enough to reach jūryō. He became the second member of his stable to reach sekitori status, following Iwakiyama, and the first to do it progressing through all the professional sumo divisions, Iwakiyama having made his debut in makushita.

Hōchiyama reached the top makuuchi division in only in three tournaments, after winning the jūryō championship in July 2006 with a 13-2 record. He could only manage five wins in his top division debut in September 2006 and was demoted back to jūryō. He reappeared in makuuchi in May 2007 but after two more make-koshi or losing scores he fell back to the second division once again in September of that year. He just missed out on immediate promotion back to the top division after recording seven wins against eight losses at the rank of jūryō 1. However, restricted by diabetes, a disastrous performance of 2-13 at the rank of jūryō 6 in the March 2008 tournament (which was his sixth consecutive losing score) saw him demoted to the third division for May.

After more than two years in makushita, he finally returned to the sekitori ranks in July 2010 after scoring 5-2 at the rank of makushita 1 in May. He came through with a winning record of 8-7, securing his kachi-koshi on the final day after four straight losses. He was one of seven rikishi from Sakaigawa stable ranked in jūryō in September 2010, the others being Iwakiyama, Gōeidō, Toyohibiki, Sadanoumi, Sadanofuji and Shironoryū. After a solid 9-6 at jūryō 5 in July 2011, he was promoted back to the top division for September after a 23 tournament absence - the fourth longest ever. He scored only 5-10 on his return and was immediately demoted back to jūryō, but he ensured with an 8-7 score at jūryō 1 in January 2012 that he was promoted to makuuchi once again for the March 2012 tournament. However he failed in his fifth attempt at a top division kachi-koshi, finishing on 4–11. In his sixth and final appearance in makuuchi he fared even worse, only scoring 1–14. He is the only wrestler in the modern era of sumo to have six top division tournaments without a kachi-koshi.

Retirement from sumo

In November 2013, after dropping to the sandanme division for the first time since the beginning of his career, Hōchiyama managed to take the championship.  He still chose to retire before the beginning of the following January 2014 tournament. He had been suffering from chronic lower back pain and diabetes. He has remained in sumo as a coach, initially under the toshiyori or elder name of Kimgahama Oyakata. He had 29 tournaments at a sekitori rank; normally 30 are required to become an oyakata but Hochiyama was allowed because his stablemaster and previous owner of the stock acted as guarantors, under new Sumo Association rules brought in on November 17, 2013. In December 2020 he switched from the Kimgahama name (owned by Okinoumi) to Furiwake (owned by the former Takamisakari).

Fighting style
Hōchiyama's favourite techniques were listed by the Sumo Association as migi-yotsu (a left hand outside, right hand inside grip on his opponent's mawashi), yori (grappling) and tsuki (thrusting). The majority of his wins were by either yori-kiri (force out) or oshi-dashi (push out).

Career record

See also
Glossary of sumo terms
List of sumo tournament second division champions
List of past sumo wrestlers
List of sumo elders

References

External links

1982 births
Living people
Japanese sumo wrestlers
People from Hirosaki
Sumo people from Aomori Prefecture